Olu Benson Lulu-Briggs, O.B Lulu-Briggs (1930–2018) was a Nigerian statesman and businessman. He was the "Iniikeroari V" of Kalabari Kingdom and the Paramount Head of Oruwari Briggs House of Abonnema. According to Forbes magazine of Africa's 40 richest (2012), Lulu-Briggs, the founder and chairman of Moni Polu oil exploration and production limited, was the 31st richest man in Africa.

References

1930 births
2018 deaths